Sinan Ateş (1984 – 30 December 2022) was a Turkish historian, academic, and politician. He worked as a lecturer at Hacettepe University and served as the general chairman of the MHP's Grey Wolves from 2019 to 2020. He was assassinated on 30 December 2022.

In connection with Ateş's death, a total of 13 people were arrested, including an MHP provincial director and two Turkish special operations police. A suspect, who was a manager at the Grey Wolves, was taken into custody from the house of former Grey Wolves President and Mersin Deputy, Olcay Manual.

Life, education and career 
He was born in 1984 in the city of Dursunbey to a family that was originally from the village of Yukarımusalar. His father, Musa Ateş, was a Grey Wolf who survived an assassination attempt.

He completed his primary and secondary education in Bursa. He graduated from the Osmangazi Ahmet Hamdi Gökbayrak Anatolian Teacher Preparation High School. In 2006, he graduated from Gazi University, Department of Social Studies Teaching. In 2009, he got his master's degree from the same university. He received his doctorate from Hacettepe University in 2018 and would work as a teacher there.

Sinan Ateş was married to Ayşe Ateş. The couple had two daughters, Bengisu and Banuçiçek. He was an avid Bursaspor supporter.

Early political career 
Ateş, who joined Bursa Grey Wolves during his high school years, chaired the high school organization of the Grey Wolves. From 2007, he became the advisor of İsmet Büyükataman, Bursa Province Deputy of the MHP. He continued his consultancy until 2019. Ateş, who has held various positions such as assistant general secretary in the Grey Wolves, after the 2016 Turkish coup d'état attempt, he chaired the FETO Commission, which was established under the MHP.

Presidential term 
On 9 January 2019, Ateş was appointed as the general chairman of the Grey Wolves, replacing Olcay Manual. The first president of Grey Wolves to be a teacher and significantly educated, he wrote children's books such as Dede Korkut, Nutuk, Kutadgu Bilig, Kür Şad Destanı and two new magazines, Bilge Türk and Dönence. He academicized the  Grey Wolves Journal and increased its circulation from 10 thousand to 50 thousand. He founded a theater and organized plays in which schoolchildren took part in. He founded the environmentalist wing of the Grey Wolves, which carries out activities such as recycling, helping stray cats and dogs, and endangered creatures.

On 29 March 2020, he reacted to the criticism of Yavuz Bahadıroğlu, who is known for his anti-Atatürk and anti-Kemalist views, on the TRT TV series "Either Independence or Death". Referring to Yavuz Bahadıroğlu and Kadir Mısıroğlu, he said, "These community microbes are more dangerous for Turkish children than the coronavirus."

Resignation and after 
Ateş resigned from this position on 2 April 2020, citing his individual academic studies and his position at Hacettepe University as more important. Ateş talked to Devlet Bahçeli about this issue in order to continue as an academic, and Bahçeli replied, "go, continue your education"

In 2021, he became a hot topic for insulting atheists.

Death 
On 30 December 2022, Ateş was attacked by his relative Selman Bozkurt and Eray Özyağcı, who was hiding behind a vehicle at 1456th Street in the Kızılırmak District of Çankaya. One bullet fired by Özyağcı accidentally hit Bozkurt and five bullets hit Ateş. Bozkurt was injured in his shoulder, Ateş was seriously injured and died on the way to the hospital.

He is the first Grey Wolves official to die by getting shot.

Funeral and memory 
On 31 December 2022, the funeral prayer was held in Bursa Ulu Mosque and he was buried in Amir Sultan Cemetery. To his funeral, the Mayor of Bursa, AKP, DEVA Party, IYI Party, MHP officials and many Bursaspor supporters attended. The nationalists attending the funeral said, "The Grey Wolves are here, where are the jackals?". He was put in a coffin wrapped with a Flag of Turkey and a Bursaspor scarf, and was buried in the grave with martyrdom written on its stone. HDP Kocaeli Province Deputy Ömer Faruk Gergerlioğlu said that Ateş's funeral was the most crowded in Bursa after Zeki Müren's funeral.

Gökçeada Municipality, led by the IYI Party, announced that it will name a street after Ateş.

References 

1984 births
2022 deaths
Assassinated Turkish people
Grey Wolves (organization) members
People from Dursunbey